Maroš Šefčovič (born 24 July 1966) is a Slovak diplomat and politician serving as Vice-President of the European Commission for Interinstitutional Relations since 2019, previously holding the office from 2010 to 2014. He has been member of the European Commission since 2009. Šefčovič also stood for office in the 2019 Slovak presidential election, which he lost against Zuzana Čaputová.

He served as European Commissioner for Education, Training, Culture and Youth from 2009 to 2010 and Vice-President of the European Commission for Interinstitutional Relations and Administration from 2010 to 2014. He also served as European Commissioner for Energy from 2014 to 2019. In 2019, he was again nominated to become Vice President for Interinstitutional Relations and Foresight.

Early life and studies
Born in Bratislava, Šefčovič originally enrolled at the University of Economics in his hometown in 1984, but left the university after one year to pursue a degree in Russia at Moscow State Institute of International Relations, where he studied from 1985 to 1990.

In June 1987, Šefčovič became a candidate for membership in the Communist Party of Czechoslovakia. After the two-year candidacy period during which he had to secure three approvals from other party members and which he embraced to "deepen his knowledge of Marxism–Leninism", he filed an application for party membership in May 1989. The party approved his application on 1 June 1989 and he became an official member.

In 2000, he obtained a PhD in international law at Comenius University in Bratislava. The subject of his dissertation thesis was Sources of the EU law and respective legislative procedures.

Diplomatic career
Šefčovič is a former Slovak diplomat, who has served in Zimbabwe, Canada, and as Slovak ambassador to Israel (1999–2002). He was also Permanent Representative of the Slovak Republic to the European Union (2004–2009).

Political career

European Commission

2009–2010: European Commissioner for Education, Training, Culture and Youth
Šefčovič replaced Ján Figeľ as European Commissioner for Education, Training, Culture and Youth on 1 October 2009.

2010–2014: Vice-President for Interinstitutional Relations and Administration
Šefčovič's responsibilities included the administration of the Commission and management of some of the Commission's Internal Services; in particular consolidation of administrative reform, personnel and administration, European Schools and security. From 19 April 2014 to 25 May 2014, José Manuel Barroso was an Acting Commissioner in Šefčovič's stead while he was on electoral campaign leave for the 2014 elections to the European Parliament.

2014–2019: European Commissioner for Energy
Šefčovič was appointed Vice-President of the European Commission for Energy Union in 2014. In July 2015, he brokered an agreement between fifteen countries from central, eastern and southeast Europe to speed up the building of gas links, improve security of supply, reduce their reliance on Russia and develop a fully integrated energy market.

When digital single market Andrus Ansip stepped down from the European Commission to take up his seat in the European Parliament following the 2019 elections, the Commission's President Jean-Claude Juncker announced that Ansip's portfolio would be transferred to Šefčovič.

2019–present: Vice-President for Interinstitutional Relations and Foresight

In September 2019 newly elected president of the European Commission Ursula von der Leyen nominated Šefčovič as vice president for interinstitutional relations and foresight. Since 2021, he has been co-chairing and representing the European Union in the Partnership Council established by the EU-UK Trade and Cooperation Agreement.

2019 Slovak presidential campaign
On 18 January 2019, Šefčovič announced that he would stand as a candidate in the 2019 Slovak presidential race, with support of the Smer–SD party.

In the first round of the election held on 16 March, Šefčovič received 18.66% of the vote and came in second place after Zuzana Čaputová, who received 40.57% of votes. They both qualified for the second round run-off, which took place on 30 March. Šefčovič was defeated by Čaputová, receiving 41.59% of the vote versus 58.41% of votes for his opponent.

Political positions

LGBT stance and other social issues
During his presidential campaign, Šefčovič repeatedly spoke against legislative changes which would improve the status of LGBT rights in Slovakia, strongly opposing both civil partnerships and same-sex adoptions. He dubbed his opponent Čaputová (who is in favour of both) as a candidate who is forcing a "new ultraliberal agenda" on Slovakia, comparing the second round of elections to a referendum on such an agenda, which he considered to be "in exact contradiction to traditional Christian values". He also stated that "we can not support any further steps towards civil unions or same-sex adoptions because these would go precisely against our traditional Christian values", calling this stance as his "very natural position" due to his Christianity. According to his opinion, discussions about "such experiments bring great unrest to society".

Šefčovič supported and welcomed the position of the Slovak parliament and government not to ratify the Istanbul Convention (aimed against violence against women and domestic violence), citing his concerns about so-called "gender ideology". Refusal to ratify the convention in his opinion confirmed that "Slovakia is built on respect to traditional values".

International relations and foreign policy
Šefčovič also criticised his opponent Čaputová for her opinions on the migrant crisis and related policies. He emphasised the importance of a speedy deportation policy, so that "people who do not have any business here are sent to their home countries as quickly as possible". Furthermore, he pointed out that "it has to be Slovaks who decide who comes to our country". Šefčovič has criticized Angela Merkel's actions in this area, labeling her "latest decisions which opened door to mass migration" as something that was not "thought-out very well".

Šefčovič criticised the then-current president of Slovakia Andrej Kiska and said that he has caused "international isolation of Slovakia".

In the matter of Russia–EU relations, Šefčovič emphasised that he does not consider Russia to be any kind of threat. He also criticised imposed sanctions, stating that people are suffering from them.

When asked about the Venezuelan presidential crisis, Šefčovič refused to identify either Nicolás Maduro or Juan Guaidó as legitimate president, stating that "leaning on one or the other side might worsen the situation".

European Union
Šefčovič rejects the idea of EU federalization, saying he is "against creating a European superstate", and considers tax policy, autonomous migration policy, and family law issues to be "red lines" which should not be crossed by the European Union.

Personal life
Šefčovič is married to Helena Šefčovičová, with whom he has 3 children: Helena, Martina, and Maroš. Šefčovič gave a TEDx talk at TEDxYouth@EEB3 in 2018.

Notes and references

External links

 Official Media Gallery
 Official website

|-

|-

|-

|-

|-

|-

1966 births
20th-century Slovak people
21st-century Slovak people
Ambassadors of Slovakia to Israel
Direction – Social Democracy politicians
Living people
Slovak Christians
Diplomats from Bratislava
Permanent Representatives of Slovakia to the European Union
Slovak European Commissioners
University of Economics in Bratislava alumni
Moscow State Institute of International Relations alumni
Comenius University alumni
European Commissioners 2014–2019
European Commissioners 2019–2024
Politicians from Bratislava
Recipients of the Order of Prince Yaroslav the Wise, 2nd class